John van den Heuvel (born 26 December 1962) is a Dutch crime journalist, television presenter and former police officer.

Career 

Since 1990, he works as crime reporter at the newspaper De Telegraaf.

He often appears in the television programme RTL Boulevard to discuss crime-related news. He is also known for presenting various crime-related television programs including Bureau Misdaad, Bureau van den Heuvel and Das je goed recht.

As of December 2017, due to concerns for his safety, he receives full-time protection by the Dienst Koninklijke en Diplomatieke Beveiliging, which also protects the Dutch royal family and other threatened individuals. This prevented him from appearing in live broadcasts of RTL Boulevard in 2018. In July 2021, Van den Heuvel also stopped appearing in broadcasts of the show after investigative journalist and crime reporter Peter R. de Vries was shot after leaving the show's studio in Amsterdam, Netherlands. In January 2022, the A2 motorway was partially closed temporarily as a result of a threat to his safety.

In 2019, he appeared in an episode of Zomergasten. In the episode he discussed the impact of living with full-time protection and the possibility of reducing it. He also presented the television show Dossier Van den Heuvel in which he travels to people around the world who have become a victim of crime.

He appeared as contestant in various game shows including De Jongens tegen de Meisjes (in 2011), Weet Ik Veel (in 2013) and Ik hou van Holland (in 2009 and 2012). In 2011, he also appeared in the television show House Ibiza, a television show by PowNed inspired by the format of Villa Felderhof. In 2019, he made his acting debut in the series Random Shit. In that same year, he appeared as police officer in the Sinterklaasjournaal. In 2020, he appeared in the Dutch version of The Masked Singer.

Personal life 

Van den Heuvel was born in Amsterdam, to a Dutch mother and a Morrocan father, and he grew up in Eindhoven. 

The assassination of Peter R. de Vries in July 2021 resulted in additional security measures for Van den Heuvel and his family. His wife lost her job as the school where she worked was not willing to accept the increased security measures.

He is a fan of the work of American novelist John Grisham.

Awards 

 2019: Pim Fortuyn Prize

Filmography

As presenter 

 Bureau Misdaad
 Bureau van den Heuvel
 Das je goed recht
 Dossier Van den Heuvel (2019)
 Ontvoerd

As contestant / guest 
 Ik hou van Holland (2009, 2012)
 De Jongens tegen de Meisjes (2011)
 Weet Ik Veel (2013)
 The Masked Singer (2020)
 Sterren op het Doek (2022)
 Isola di Beau (2022)

As actor 

 Random Shit (2019)
 Sinterklaasjournaal (2019)

References

External links 

 

1962 births
Living people
Mass media people from Amsterdam
Dutch television presenters
Dutch male film actors
Dutch people of Moroccan descent
Dutch investigative journalists
20th-century Dutch journalists
21st-century Dutch journalists